The Lord High Commissioner to the Parliament of Scotland was the monarch of Scotland's's personal representative to the Parliament of Scotland. From the accession of James VI of Scotland to the throne of England in 1603, a Lord High Commissioner was appointed from among the senior nobility to represent the Scottish monarch in parliament when he or she was absent, as was usually the case up to 1707.  The Act of Union 1707, which merged the Parliament of Scotland and the Parliament of England to create the Parliament of Great Britain, rendered the post redundant.

The Lord High Commissioner represented Crown authority and sat on the throne within the parliamentary chamber. The Commissioner gave royal assent to all acts of parliament by touching the final copy of each act with the sceptre. They were the custodian of the Crown's legislative agenda and were effectively the heads of government in Scotland during this period.

List of Lords High Commissioner

References

See also
 Commissioner (Scottish Parliament)
 Lord High Commissioner to the General Assembly of the Church of Scotland
 Lord Chancellor of Scotland

 
Representatives of the Scottish monarch
Lists of political office-holders in Scotland
1603 establishments in Scotland
1707 disestablishments in Scotland